Beth Israel Congregation is a Conservative synagogue located at 2000 Washtenaw Avenue in Ann Arbor, Michigan. Established in 1916, Beth Israel is the oldest synagogue in Ann Arbor.

In 2009, the egalitarian congregation had 480 member households, and the Rabbi is Nadav Caine. 

Nadav Caine joined as rabbi in 2018.

Notes

Conservative synagogues in Michigan
Organizations based in Ann Arbor, Michigan
Jewish organizations established in 1916
Buildings and structures in Ann Arbor, Michigan